Kiting may refer to:

 Flying a kite
 Check kiting, a form of banking fraud
 Domain kiting, a practice in domain name registration
 Kiting, a video game term
 Kiting, or ballooning, a process by which spiders move through the air

See also
 Kite (disambiguation)
 Index of kite articles
 Kiteboarding, a water sport